The 1999 Kentucky Derby was the 125th running of the Kentucky Derby. The race took place on May 1, 1999. There were 151,051 in attendance.

Payout
The 125th Kentucky Derby Payout Schedule

 $2 Exacta: (11-13)  Paid   $727.80
 $2 Trifecta: (11-13-8)  Paid   $5,866.20
 $1 Superfecta: (11-13-8-9)  Paid   $24,015.50

Full results

See also 
1999 Preakness Stakes
1999 Belmont Stakes

References

1999
Kentucky Derby
Derby
Kentucky
May 1999 sports events in the United States